Laelia is a genus of tussock moths in the family Erebidae. The genus was described by Stephens in 1828. Species are well distributed throughout Europe, Japan, China, India, Sri Lanka, Myanmar and Java.

Description
They are nocturnal moths. Palpi long and porrect (extending forward) with heavily hairy second joint and long third joint. Antennae with long branches in males and short in females. Forewings are more produced than in Aroa, where the wing membrane forms a slight concavity on the ventral side beyond the upper angle of cell. Neuration is similar.

Species

Laelia actuosa Hering, 1926
Laelia acuta (Snellen, 1881)
Laelia adalia Swinhoe, 1900
Laelia aegra Hering, 1926
Laelia amabilis Aurivillius, 1879
Laelia amaura Hering, 1926
Laelia amaurotera Collenette, 1932
Laelia anamesa Collenette, 1934
Laelia andricela Collenette, 1936
Laelia atestacea Hampson, [1893]
Laelia aureus Janse, 1915
Laelia barsineides (Holland, 1893)
Laelia basibrunnea (Holland, 1893)
Laelia bethuneana Strand, 1914
Laelia bifascia Hampson, 1905
Laelia bilati Dufrane, 1940
Laelia bonaberiensis (Strand, 1915)
Laelia buana (Moore, 1859)
Laelia buruana (Holland, 1900)
Laelia calamaria Hampson, 1900
Laelia cardinalis Hampson, [1893]
Laelia cinnamomea (Moore, 1879)
Laelia clarki Janse, 1915
Laelia coenosa (Hübner, [1808])
Laelia colon (Hampson, 1891)
Laelia conioptera Collenette, 1936
Laelia dabano Collenette, 1934
Laelia devestita (Walker, 1865)
Laelia dochmia Collenette, 1961
Laelia eos Hering, 1926
Laelia erythrobaphes Collenette, 1934
Laelia eutricha Collenette, 1931
Laelia exclamationis (Kollar, 1848)
Laelia extrema Hering, 1926
Laelia farinosa Röber, 1925
Laelia fasciata (Moore, [1883])
Laelia figlina Distant, 1899
Laelia flandria Collenette, 1937
Laelia fracta Schaus & Clemens, 1893
Laelia furva Turner, 1931
Laelia gigantea Butler, 1885
Laelia gwelila (Swinhoe, 1903)
Laelia haematica Hampson, 1905
Laelia heringi Schultze, 1934
Laelia heterogyna Hampson, [1893]
Laelia hodopoea Collenette, 1955
Laelia hypoleucis Holland, 1893
Laelia janeschi Hering, 1926
Laelia japonibia Strand, 1911
Laelia juvenis (Walker, 1855)
Laelia lavia Swinhoe, 1903
Laelia leucolepis Mabille, 1897
Laelia lignicolor Holland, 1893
Laelia lilacina Moore, 1884
Laelia litura (Walker, 1855)
Laelia lophietes Collenette, 1932
Laelia lutulenta Collenette, 1960
Laelia marginepunctata Bethune-Baker, 1908
Laelia mesoxantha Hering, 1926
Laelia monoscola Collenette, 1934
Laelia municipalis Distant, 1897
Laelia nebrodes Collenette, 1947
Laelia nigripulverea Janse, 1915
Laelia obsoleta (Fabricius, 1793)
Laelia ocellata Holland, 1893
Laelia ochripalpis Strand, 1914
Laelia omissa (Holland, 1893)
Laelia ordinata (Karsch, 1895)
Laelia orthra Collenette, 1936
Laelia paetula (Hering, 1926)
Laelia pallida Moore, 1884
Laelia pantana Collenette, 1938
Laelia perbrunnea Hampson, 1910
Laelia phaeobalia Collenette, 1932
Laelia phillipinensis Collenette, 1934
Laelia polia Collenette, 1936
Laelia prolata Swinhoe, 1892
Laelia pulcherrima (Hering, 1926)
Laelia punctulata (Butler, 1875)
Laelia pyrrhothrix Collenette, 1938
Laelia rhodea Collenette, 1947
Laelia rivularis Hampson, 1910
Laelia robusta Janse, 1915
Laelia rogersi Bethune-Baker, 1913
Laelia rosea Schaus & Clements, 1893
Laelia rufolavia Hering, 1928
Laelia siga Hering, 1926
Laelia somalica Collenette, 1931
Laelia stigmatica (Holland, 1893)
Laelia straminea Hampson, 1910
Laelia striata Wileman, 1910
Laelia subrosea (Walker, 1855)
Laelia subviridis Janse, 1915
Laelia suffusa (Walker, 1855)
Laelia swinnyi Janse, 1915
Laelia testacea (Moore, 1879)
Laelia turneri Collenette, 1934
Laelia umbrina (Moore, 1888)
Laelia unicoloris van Eecke, 1928
Laelia uniformis Hampson, 1891
Laelia venosa Moore, 1877

References

Lymantriinae
Moth genera